Sir Reginald Herbert Brade  (1864 – 1933) was a British civil servant.

Life
Brade was educated at Bradfield College. He entered the War Office as Clerk of the Higher Division of the Civil Service in 1884. He was a Private Secretary between 1892 and 1896, first to Lord Sandhurst and Lord Monkswell when they were Parliamentary Under-Secretary of State for War, and then to Joseph Powell Williams when he was Financial Secretary to the War Office. Between 1901 and 1914, Brade was a Secretary of the Army Council and Assistant Secretary of the War Office. He was the Permanent Under-Secretary of State for War from 1914 to 1920. He also was Secretary and Registrar of the Distinguished Service Order in 1906. He was Gentleman Usher to the Sword of State from 1924 until his death.

Honours and awards
Order of the Bath (UK)
Knight Grand Cross (GCB) 1919
Knight Commander (KCB) 1914
Companion (CB) 1906
King George V Coronation Medal (UK)
Commander (Commandeur) of the Legion of Honour (Légion d'honneur), France
Commander (Commandeur) of the Order of Leopold (Leopoldsorde/Ordre de Léopold), Belgium

References 

The Next of Kin Memorial Plaque – website of The Imperial War Museum
Who was Who: 1934
UK Census 1881. (Scholar St Andrews College, Bradfield)
National Archives; Cabinet Papers

1864 births
1933 deaths
People educated at Bradfield College
British civil servants
Knights Grand Cross of the Order of the Bath
Commandeurs of the Légion d'honneur
Order of Leopold (Belgium)